Maplewood is an unincorporated community in Door County, in the town of Forestville, Wisconsin, United States. The nearest city to Maplewood is Sturgeon Bay. Maplewood is located along Wisconsin Highway 42 approximately 3 miles (5 km) south of its junction with Wisconsin Highway 57. A small county park in the center of Maplewood provides an eating area and restrooms for users of the Ahnapee State Trail.

Images

References

Unincorporated communities in Wisconsin
Unincorporated communities in Door County, Wisconsin